Stony Ridge may refer to:

 10168 Stony Ridge, a main-belt asteroid
 Stony Ridge, Indiana, an unincorporated community in the United States
 Stony Ridge, Ohio, a census-designated place in the United States
 Stony Ridge Observatory, an astronomical observatory in California